Trémargat is a commune in the Côtes-d'Armor department of Brittany in northwestern France.

Population

People from Trémargat are called trémargatois in French and tremargadiz in Breton.

The commune's unusual demographics lend it to unusual political leanings; in the 2012 presidential election, Trémargat was the one of the few communes where Eva Joly of Europe Ecology – The Greens secured a plurality of the vote, with 29.03% support, followed closely by Jean-Luc Mélenchon of the Left Front at 27.42%.

See also
Communes of the Côtes-d'Armor department

References

External links

Communes of Côtes-d'Armor